L.A.B. are a New Zealand reggae band formed in Whakatāne, Bay of Plenty in 2016. Its founding members are Brad Kora (backing vocals and drums) and Stuart Kora (backing vocals, keyboard and guitar) of the band Kora. They soon engaged Joel Shadbolt on lead vocals and guitar, Ara Adams-Tamatea, formerly of Katchafire, as bassist, and Miharo Gregory as keyboardist. The band mostly composes reggae music, with a mix of electronic, blues, rock and funk music.

Their song "In the Air" topped the New Zealand Singles Chart in March 2020. At the end of the year, it was ranked as New Zealand's best-performing single of 2020. It stayed in the top 10 for 73 weeks, longer than any other single, and at 9x platinum is New Zealand's all-time best-selling single. "Why Oh Why" also topped the New Zealand chart in December 2020. By mid-2021, "Why Oh Way" had gained popularity at Island Reggae radio stations across Hawaii.

In July 2020, the band announced their first summer show date for January 2021 with The Black Seeds, Mako Road, Bailey Wiley and Anna Coddington in support.

Discography

Studio albums

Remix albums

Singles

Other charted songs

Notes

References 

New Zealand reggae musical groups
Pacific reggae
People from Whakatāne